Croatian wine (pl. ) has a history dating back to the Ancient Greek settlers, and their wine production on the southern Dalmatian islands of Vis, Hvar and Korčula some 2,500 years ago. Like other old world wine producers, many traditional grape varieties still survive in Croatia, perfectly suited to their local wine hills. Modern wine-production methods have taken over in the larger wineries and EU-style wine regulations have been adopted, guaranteeing the quality of the wine.

There are currently over 300 geographically defined wine regions and a strict classification system to ensure quality and origin. The majority of Croatian wine is white, with most of the remainder being red and only a small percentage being rosé wines. In 2014, Croatia ranked 32nd in wine production by country with an estimated 45,272 tonnes.

Wine is a popular drink in Croatia, and locals traditionally like to drink wine with their meals.

History 

Like the rest of Central Europe and Southern Europe, viticulture in the present-day Croatia existed hundreds of years before the rise of the Roman Empire. Recent research has shown that the Illyrians living in Dalmatia during the Bronze Age and Iron Age may already have grown grapevines. However, the true beginning of grape cultivation and wine production in Croatia is related to the Ancient Greeks settlers, who arrived on the Croatian coast in the 5th century BC. The Greek writer Athenaeus wrote 18 centuries ago about the high quality wine produced on the Dalmatian islands of Vis, Hvar and Korčula. Coins from the period have motifs related to grape cultivation and wine, demonstrating the importance of wine in the economics of the ancient Greek colonies.

Under the Roman Empire, wine production grew, becoming more organized. Wine was exported to other parts of the empire. Artifacts from this time include stone presses for squeezing grapes and amphoras from sunken Roman galleys. Decorations on numerous religious and household items bear witness to the wine-making culture.

As the Croatians arrived and settled the area, they learned from their predecessors, and wine production continued to expand. During the Middle Ages, there was a royal court official called the "royal wine procurer", whose responsibilities included the production and procurement of wine. Free towns adopted legal standards on winegrowing and protected it accordingly. For example, a statute of the town and island of Korčula in 1214 contains strict rules protecting the vineyards.

In the 15th century, the Ottoman Turks arrived in South Eastern Europe, and imposed strict anti-alcohol laws as part of the new Islamic law. Fortunately, the Ottoman Empire was tolerant of Christianity.
Catholic church traditions involving wine may have “saved” local wine production from complete extinction—as priests and monks were permitted to continue making wine for church services.

In the 18th century, much of present-day Croatia came under control of the Habsburg Empire, where wine production flourished through the 19th and 20th centuries. The history of wine changed dramatically in 1874, when phylloxera, a hazardous grapevine pest, started to appear in Europe. Wine production dropped, first in France and Germany, as growers struggled with the blight. For a time, Croatian vineyards remained unaffected, and wine exports greatly increased to fill the demand. Some French companies even planted vines in Croatia with a view to expanding operations in the safe area. However, by the turn of the 20th century, Croatian vines had also succumbed to phylloxera, leading to the destruction of the vineyards and the collapse of the local economy in many areas. Large numbers of winegrowing families moved to the new world, contributing to the growth of wine production there.

Under the communist system of Yugoslavia, wine production was centered in large cooperatives, and private ownership of vineyards was discouraged. Quantity rather than quality became the main focus. The Croatian War of Independence in the early 1990s saw many vineyards and wineries once again destroyed. However, with the move back to small, independent producers, Croatian wines are once again competing with the best in the world wine market.

Geography and climate

Croatia is a Mediterranean country, lying to the east of Italy, across the Adriatic Sea. Towards the north lie the Alps, and to the north-east the country forms the western end of the great Pannonian Plain.

The interior of Croatia has a continental climate, with cold winters, and hot summers with enough rain to make it a major agricultural area. Winegrowing is concentrated in the hilly areas bordering on the Pannonian Plain.

The Dalmatian Coast is typically Mediterranean in climate, though the Dinaric Alps mountain range creates pockets of alpine climate at higher altitudes. The coastline of the Adriatic Sea is ideal for grape cultivation with its hot, humid summers and mild winters. Further down the coast, and on the islands, grapes are grown on the karst hillside, sometimes steep slopes with little rainfall. Some of the best-known wine-production areas are on the Dalmatian islands. Located along hillsides and slopes, wine regions along the coast receive many hours of sunlight, ideal for grape production. Croatia is also home to the Slavonian oak forest, which provides oak for the casks favoured by many European winemakers for aging their finest wines.

The average inland temperature is between 0 and 2 °C in January, and between 19 and 23 °C in August. Average coastal temperatures range from 6–11 °C in January to 21–27 °C in August. Sea temperature averages 12 °C in winter and 25 °C in summer.

Wine styles
There are two distinct wine-producing regions in Croatia. The continental region in the north-east of the country produces rich fruity white wines, similar in style to the neighbouring areas of Slovenia, Austria and Hungary. On the north coast, Istrian wines are similar to those produced in neighbouring Italy, while further south production is more towards big Mediterranean-style reds. On the islands and the Dalmatian coast, local grape varieties, microclimates and the rather harsh nature of the vineyards leads to some highly individual wines, and some of Croatia's best known.

The majority (67%) of wine produced is white and produced in the interior, while 32% is red and produced mainly along the coast. Rosé is relatively rare. Some special wines, such as sparkling wine ( or ) and dessert wine, are also produced.

Wine Regions 

Croatia has three main wine regions: Eastern Continental (Istočna kontinentalna), Western Continental (Zapadna kontinentalna) and Coastal (Primorska), which also includes the islands. Each of the main regions is divided into sub-regions, which are divided yet further into smaller vinogorje (literally wine hills). Altogether, there are more than 300 geographically defined wine-producing areas in Croatia. More than half of the wine production is concentrated in three counties: Istria, Osijek-Baranja and Vukovar-Srijem.

Eastern Continental Croatia 

The eastern inland wine region includes Slavonia and the Croatian Danube. It is a relatively flat area bordered by three rivers: the Danube, Drava and Sava. Vineyards are generally located on the low hills rising from the plain. It has a typical continental climate with cold winters and hot summers, and production is concentrated in white wine varieties. The best-known area within this region is Slavonia; the most widely planted grape is Graševina, which yields light, crisp, refreshing, mildly aromatic wines.

The continental region is divided into the following sub-regions:

Western Continental Croatia 

The western inland wine region includes the Croatian uplands and is characterized by rolling hills and a cool climate with very cold winters. The sloping vineyards ensure sufficient sun and wind during the growing season, and the wines here display intense aromas and high levels of acidity. Production is concentrated in white wine varieties.

The continental region is divided into the following sub-regions:

Coastal Croatia 

Officially, the coastal wine region runs from Istria in the north to Dalmatia to the south. However, due to the widely differing growing conditions, the grape varietals, and the resulting wines, the coastal region is often divided into two parts: Istria/Kvarner and Dalmatia.

Istria and Kvarner are where the warmth of the Mediterranean meets the cold from the Alps, making for a cooler climate than the southern part of the coastal region. A very rich red soil, rich in iron oxides, combined with the mild climate make this area ideal for wine production. In Istria and the north coast, the focus is on fruity, dry white wines from a wide range of grape varieties, but mostly Malvazija, as well as bold, dry reds including Teran.

Istria has a rich history of viticulture and is one of the oldest wine regions in Europe. The topography of the region is hilly with an extremely long coastline. This means that there is a range of microclimates across the region, allowing for the growth of a range of grape varietals and the production of a diverse catalog of wines. Currently, there is 4000 ha under the vine in Istria. At the end of the 19th century, the area under vine was 44 000 ha but this decreased dramatically after phylloxera struck the region.

Further south, in Dalmatia, with its rocky landscapes, the islands and hillsides have an infinite variety of microclimates resulting in a winegrowing area where terroir is a crucially important factor. A wide range of indigenous grape varietals are grown here, the best known being Plavac Mali, the child of Zinfandel and Dobričić. The coastal region is divided into the following sub-regions (listed from north to south):

Grape Varieties 

 
The grape varieties in use in Croatia can be very confusing to foreigners, not simply because the Croatian names are unfamiliar, but because many of the varieties may not be in use beyond a very limited area. There are indeed many foreign "international" grape varieties grown in Croatia but its long history of wine production has left it with a rich tradition of indigenous varieties, especially in the more out-lying areas and the more extreme growing conditions. Some of these have been so successful that they are in widespread use within Croatia, yet remain relatively unknown outside the country. One such is Plavac Mali, the foundation of many highly regarded Dalmatian red wines.

The well-known Napa Valley winemaker Miljenko "Mike" Grgich is a Croatian native, and he has argued the case for Zinfandel being descended from the Plavac Mali grape. DNA testing has now demonstrated that Plavac Mali is in fact a child of the true original Zinfandel, which is a little-planted grape from the same area named Crljenak Kaštelanski.

Following the devastation of the vines by phylloxera at the end of the 19th century, Croatian vineyards were replanted by grafting the traditional varieties on to American root stock. Only a very few pre-phylloxera vines still survive today on a couple of the islands (Korčula, and Susak). In recent years, foreign-based winemakers and investors are taking an interest in Croatia's many indigenous grape varieties. As the battle against phylloxera continues, broadening the gene pool may be one way to help prevent a recurrence.

The tables below give an overview of the common varieties, alternative names, and where they are grown.

White wine grapes

Red Wine Grapes

Classification 

In 1961, Dingač and then, in 1967, Postup were registered for Yugoslav state protection.

The Croatian Institute of Viticulture and Enology was set up in 1996 to oversee the country's wine industry, and be responsible for regulating winegrowing and wine production. Standards, similar to the EU wine regulations, were set up to ensure the consistent quality of the final product. Croatian wines are classified by quality, which is clearly marked on the label.
 Vrhunsko Vino: Premium Quality Wine
 Kvalitetno Vino: Quality Wine
 Stolno Vino: Table Wine
In addition, wines may qualify for a geographical origin stamp, if it is produced from grapes grown in the same winegrowing region. The definition becomes stricter for higher-quality classifications, so that a premium quality wine with geographical origin stamp must meet criteria for the type of grape, the position in the vinogorije (winegrowing hill) with the distinct quality and characteristics for the variety. If the wine has a grape varietal stamp, it must be at least 85% of the grape type whose name it carries. Distinctive quality wines have a special quality, attained in certain years, in special conditions of maturation, manner of harvesting and processing, and must be produced only from the recommended sorts of grape for the particular winegrowing hills.

Wines qualifying for a vintage designation, known as Arhiv, must be kept in cellar conditions longer than its optimal maturation period, and not less than 5 years from the day of processing grape into wine, of which at least 3 years in a bottle.
 Suho: Dry
 Polusuho: Semi-dry
 Slatko: Sweet
 Bijelo: White
 Crno: Red (literally Black)
 Rosa: Rosé
 Prošek: Dalmatian dessert wine made from dried grapes, similar to Italian Vin Santo

Despite these various classifications systems, Croatian wines don't have a DO or AOC system like Spain, Italy, or France, which can make it confusing to understand a wine's grade or origin.

Wine production 

As of 2018, the five largest wine producers are:
 Iločki podrumi (Ilok)
 Agrolaguna (Poreč)
 Kutjevo d.d. (Kutjevo)
 Belje d.d. (Darda)
 Erdutski vinogradi (Erdut)

See also 
Croatian cuisine

References

Sources

Further reading

External links 

 Vinistra
 Vinopedia Croatian Wine Reference